Nannostomus eques, (from the Greek: nanos = small, and the Latin stomus = relating to the mouth; from the Latin: eques = horseman), commonly known as the diptail pencilfish or brown pencilfish, is a freshwater species of fish belonging to the characin family Lebiasinidae. It was first described in 1876 by Franz Steindachner making it one of the first members of the genus to be discovered and described. It is fairly typical of members of this genus being a small, elongated fish with prominent horizontal stripes. It occurs quite widely in South America, having been recorded in Brazil, Peru, Colombia, and Guyana. It is also quite commonly met with in the aquarium trade where its habit of swimming and posturing at a 'snout-up' angle—one of two Nannostomus species to do so, the other being Nannostomus unifasciatus—makes it a popular choice.

References

Lebiasinidae
Fish described in 1876
Taxa named by Franz Steindachner
Fish of South America
Fish of the Amazon basin